was a Japanese video game developing company. They have made video games for console systems primarily for the Japanese video game market, as well as a handful of arcade games. On December 1, 2015, Winkysoft filed for bankruptcy.

Notable games

Akanbe Dragon (MSX2)
Denjinmakai (Arcade)
Doctor Lautrec and the Forgotten Knights (Nintendo 3DS)
Hero Senki: Project Olympus (Super Famicom)
Super Dimension Fortress Macross: Scrambled Valkyrie (Super Famicom)
JoJo No Kimyo Na Boken (Super Famicom)
Ghost Chaser Densei (Super Famicom)
Guardians (Arcade)
Masou Kishin (Super Famicom)
Battle Robot Retsuden (Super Famicom)
My Life My Love: Boku no Yume: Watashi no Negai (Famicom)
Mazinger Z (Super Famicom)
Puyo Puyo (Game Boy)
Ruin (FM-7)
Super Robot Wars (Game Boy)
2nd Super Robot Wars (Famicom)
3rd Super Robot Wars  (Super Famicom)
4th Super Robot Wars  (Super Famicom)
Super Robot Wars F  (Sega Saturn, PlayStation)
Super Robot Wars F Final  (Sega Saturn, PlayStation)
Seireiki Rayblade  (PlayStation, Dreamcast)
Transformers (PlayStation 2)
New Century Brave Wars/Quantum Leap Lazelber (PlayStation 2)
Shaman King: Power of Spirits (Playstation 2)

References

External links
Official website 
Winkysoft at GameSpot
Winkysoft at GDRI
Winksoft at Insert Credit
Winkysoft at Neoseeker

Companies based in Osaka Prefecture
Video game companies established in 1983
Video game companies disestablished in 2015
Defunct video game companies of Japan
Video game development companies
Companies that have filed for bankruptcy in Japan